John "Rex" Dockery (February 7, 1942 – December 12, 1983) was an American football player and coach. He served as the head football coach at Texas Tech University from 1978 to 1980 and at Memphis State University, now the University of Memphis, from 1981 to 1983, compiling a career college football record of 23–40–3. Dockery was killed in a plane crash in 1983.

Early life
Dockery was born on February 7, 1942, in Cleveland, Tennessee. He was a 1960 graduate of Bradley Central High School in Cleveland. In high school, he played several sports and was an all-state guard on the football team. He went on to receive a degree from the University of Tennessee where he played four years of football for the Vols.

Coaching career
Dockery got his coaching start as a graduate assistant at Tennessee. He then coached football at Harriman High School the 1966 and 1967 seasons. The following year, he took the head coaching job at Morristown East High School and led the team to a state championship in 1969.

Tennessee, Georgia Tech, and Vanderbilt
Moving to the college ranks, Dockery became an assistant under Bill Battle at Tennessee. During his time there, he coached Phillip Fulmer and was responsible for recruiting Condredge Holloway. In 1972, Dockery became the offensive line coach at Georgia Tech, where he was reunited with his high school teammate Steve Sloan.

Dockery followed Sloan to Vanderbilt in 1973. When Sloan went on to Texas Tech two years later, Dockery went with him as offensive coordinator.

Texas Tech
When Steve Sloan left Texas Tech for Ole Miss in 1978, Dockery became the team's head coach. He coached at Texas Tech from 1978 to 1980, compiling a 15–16–2 record, and being named the Southwest Conference Coach of the Year in 1978.

Memphis State
Dockery served as the head football coach for the Memphis Tigers from 1981 to 1983. He had an 8–24–1 record at Memphis State (now University of Memphis), starting his tenure with back-to-back 1–10 seasons and going 6–4–1 in his final season.

Death and honors
Dockery was killed in a plane crash on December 12, 1983, in Lawrenceburg, Tennessee, en route to an appearance before the Quarterback Club there. Also killed in the crash were Memphis State freshman Charles Greenhill, offensive coordinator Chris Faros, and booster Glenn Jones. On December 13, 1984, Dockery's widow Wallene filed a lawsuit against Memphis State University seeking unpaid contractual payments.

In December 1983, the playing surface at the Liberty Bowl Memorial Stadium was named Rex Dockery Field. Dockery's high school also presents The Rex Dockery Award in his memory.

Personal life
Dockery and his wife Wallene had two sons, Trey and Dee. Dee Dockery currently serves as a physician at the Campbell Clinic Medical Center in Memphis.

Head coaching record

College

References

1942 births
1983 deaths
Georgia Tech Yellow Jackets football coaches
Memphis Tigers football coaches
Tennessee Volunteers football coaches
Tennessee Volunteers football players
Texas Tech Red Raiders football coaches
Vanderbilt Commodores football coaches
High school football coaches in Tennessee
People from Cleveland, Tennessee
Players of American football from Tennessee
Accidental deaths in Tennessee
Victims of aviation accidents or incidents in 1983
Victims of aviation accidents or incidents in the United States